The sixteenth edition of the Caribbean Series (Serie del Caribe) was played in . It was held from February 1 through February 6 with the champions teams from Dominican Republic (Tigres del Licey), Mexico (Yaquis de Obregón), Puerto Rico (Cangrejeros de Santurce) and Venezuela (Leones del Caracas). The format consisted of 12 games, each team facing the other teams twice, and the games were played at UCV Stadium in Caracas, Venezuela. The Series was played to honor the memory of Roberto Clemente, who died on December 31, 1972, during a humanitarian mission to assist victims of the 1972 Nicaragua earthquake.

Summary
The powerful Dominican Republic team, managed by Tommy Lasorda, captured the competition with a 5-1 record, with the only defeat coming from Venezuela in Game 4. The Dominicans hit a collective .329 average, committed only three errors, and outscored their rivals 44-19. Pedro Borbón (2-0) led the pitching staff, while OFs Jesús Alou and Manny Mota tied in the race for the batting title, with a .500 average (12-for-24). SS Bobby Valentine, who provided opportune hitting and a sharp defense, was named Series Most Valuable Player. The team also featured Ps Bruce Ellingsen, Lerrin LaGrow, Charlie Hough and Dick Tidrow; C Steve Yeager; IFs Jim Spencer (1B), Ted Martínez (2B) and Steve Garvey (3B), and OFs Elvio Jiménez and Von Joshua.

The Puerto Rico and  Venezuela teams, managed by Frank Robinson and Ozzie Virgil respectively, were not rivals for the Dominicans and tied in second place with a 3-3 record.

Puerto Rico's victories came behind pitching efforts from Doyle Alexander, (2-0, 1.20 ERA, 13.0 IP) and Juan Pizarro (1-1, 5.25 ERA, 12.0 IP). Other significant players in the roster included Ps Lloyd Allen,  Roger Moret, Bob Reynolds, Ramón Hernández and Mike Strahler; C Elrod Hendricks; IFs Tony Pérez (1B), Jerry DaVanon (2B), Ron Cey (3B) and Juan Beníquez (SS); Ofs Don Baylor (LF), José Cruz (CF) and Willie Crawford, and utilities Julio Gotay (IF) and Angel Mangual (OF).

Venezuela divided wins and losses against each team. RF César Tovar (.385 BA) and 1B Gonzalo Márquez (.381 BA) paced the offense, while Diego Seguí pitched a complete game, seven-hit shutout with 15 strikeouts. Other support came from P Milt Wilcox  (1-1, 3.27 ERA), 3B Manny Trillo (.476 SLG, five RBI) and C Joe Ferguson (.423 SLG, five RBI). The rest of the roster included P Ed Acosta, OF Tony Armas,  SS Bert Campaneris, P Reggie Cleveland, CF Víctor Davalillo, OF Bobby Darwin, 2B Gustavo Gil, C Dave Ricketts and P Ed Sprague, among others.

The Mexicans, with Dave Garcia at the helm, posted a 1-5 record and finished in last place. Their only victory came against Venezuela, 3–1,  behind the combined pitching performance of the Romo brothers (Vicente and Enrique) and closer Al Hrabosky. Also in the roster were 1B Jim Campanis, Ps Maximino León and Rich Troedson, 3B Dave Hilton, and OF Matt Alexander.

Scoreboards

Game 1, February 1

Game 2, February 1

Game 3, February 2

Game 4, February 2

Game 5, February 3

Game 6, February 3

Game 7, February 4

Game 8, February 4

Game 9, February 5

Game 10, February 5

Game 11, February 6

Game 12, February 6

See also
Ballplayers who have played in the Series

Sources
Antero Núñez, José. Series del Caribe. Impresos Urbina, Caracas, Venezuela.
Araujo Bojórquez, Alfonso. Series del Caribe: Narraciones y estadísticas, 1949-2001. Colegio de Bachilleres del Estado de Sinaloa, Mexico.
Figueredo, Jorge S. Cuban Baseball: A Statistical History, 1878–1961. Macfarland & Co., United States.
González Echevarría, Roberto. The Pride of Havana. Oxford University Express.
Gutiérrez, Daniel. Enciclopedia del Béisbol en Venezuela, Caracas, Venezuela.

External links
Official site
Latino Baseball
Series del Caribe, Las (Spanish)

 
 

Caribbean
Caribbean Series
International baseball competitions hosted by Venezuela
Sports competitions in Caracas
1973 in Caribbean sport
1973 in Venezuelan sport
Caribbean Series
20th century in Caracas